Ganguelia is a monotypic genus of flowering plants in the family Rubiaceae. The genus contains only one species, viz. Ganguelia gossweileri, which is endemic to Angola. It was established when  the species Oxyanthus gossweileri was transferred to a new genus in the tribe Gardenieae.

References

Gardenieae
Monotypic Rubiaceae genera